Judith Blake may refer to 

 Judith Blake, Baroness Blake of Leeds (born 1953), British politician
 Judith Blake (scientist), American computational biologist
 Judith Blake (sociologist) (1926–1993), American sociologist and demographer